The 2022–23 Maryland Terrapins women's basketball represents the University of Maryland, College Park in the 2022–23 college basketball season. Led by twentyfirst year head coach Brenda Frese, the team plays their games at the Xfinity Center and are members of the Big Ten Conference.

Schedule and results

|-
!colspan=12 style=|Regular season

|-
!colspan=6 style=|

|-
!colspan=6 style=|

Rankings

See also
 2022–23 Maryland Terrapins men's basketball team

References

Maryland Terrapins women's basketball seasons
Maryland Terrapins
Maryland Terrapins women's basketball
Maryland Terrapins women's basketball
Maryland